The Benoit Freeman Project 2 is an collaboration album by American pianist David Benoit and American guitarist Russ Freeman released in 2004, and recorded for the Peak label. The album reached #7 on Billboards Jazz chart.
Russ Freeman also serves as leader and frontman for the Rippingtons.

Track listing
All tracks composed by David Benoit and Russ Freeman; except where indicated 
"Palmetto Park" - 4:01
"Via Nueve" - 5:17
"Montecito" (Russ Freeman) - 4:40
"Club Havana" (Russ Freeman) - 5:37
"Two Survivors" (Al Anderson, Nicholas Gary) - 5:04
"Samba" - 4:48
"Moon Through the Window" (David Benoit) - 4:30
"Struttin'" - 4:42
"Stiletto Heels" - 4:12
"Waiting for the Stars to Fall" (Russ Freeman) - 3:32

 Personnel 
 David Benoit – acoustic piano, Fender Rhodes, Yamaha MOTIF 8, orchestra arrangements and conductor (2, 5, 7, 10)
 Russ Freeman – synthesizers, acoustic guitar, classical guitar, electric guitar, guitar synthesizer
 Dave Carpenter – bass (2)
 Byron House – bass (6)
 Vinnie Colaiuta – drums (1, 4, 6-10)
 Peter Erskine – drums (2, 5)
 Luis Conte – percussion 
 Chris Botti – trumpet (4, 8)
 David Pack – vocals (3)
 Vince Gill – vocals (5)The Nashville String Machine (Tracks 2, 5, 7 & 10):
 Carl Gorodetzky – concertmaster 
 Julie Eidsvoog, John Eidsvoog and Suzie Katayama – music preparation 
 Jennifer Kummer – French Horn
 Bobby Taylor – oboe
 Jack Jezioro and Craig Nelson – acoustic bass 
 Anthony LaMarchina, Bob Mason and Carole Rabinowitz – cello 
 Jim Grosjean, Gary Vanosdale and Kristin Wilkinson – viola 
 David Angell, Janet Askey, David Davidson, Conni Ellisor, Carl Gorodetzky, Gerald Greer, Lee Larrison, Cate Myer, Pamela Sixfin, Alan Umstead, Cathy Umstead and Mary Kathryn Vanosdale – violin

 Production 
 David Benoit – producer
 Russ Freeman – producer, executive producer, vocal producer (5)
 Andi Howard – executive producer, management (for Russ Freeman)
 Mark Wexler – executive producer 
 Steve Bishir – engineer
 Clark Germain – engineer
 Jason Lefan – assistant engineer
 Tom Sweeney – assistant engineer
 Matt Weeks – assistant engineer
 Steve Sykes – mixing 
 Robert Hadley – mastering 
 Doug Sax – mastering 
 Ron Moss (Chapman & Co.) – management (for David Benoit)Studios'
 Recorded at Record One (Sherman Oaks, CA); The Tracking Room (Nashville, TN); Sound Kitchen (Franklin, TN).
 Mastered at The Mastering Lab (Hollywood, CA).

Charts

References

External links
Benoit/Freeman Project at Discogs

2004 albums
David Benoit (musician) albums
Russ Freeman (guitarist) albums
Peak Records albums